The Yitzhak Rabin Center is a library and research center in Tel Aviv, Israel, built in memory of assassinated Israeli prime minister Yitzhak Rabin. 

The Yitzhak Rabin Center, designed by the Israeli architect, Moshe Safdie, sits on a hill commanding a panoramic view of Hayarkon Park and Tel Aviv, near the Eretz Israel Museum, the Palmach Museum, Tel Aviv University and Beth Hatefutsoth. The inauguration ceremony took place in November 2005, on the tenth anniversary of Rabin's assassination.

History
The center was erected on the foundations of a top secret power station known as "Reading G" or "J'ora." Built in 1954–1956 to supply power in the event of an enemy bombing, it was financed in part by the German reparations agreement.

Museum
A permanent exhibition at the Rabin Center is dedicated to the history of society and democracy in Israel with the life of Yitzhak Rabin serving as a connecting thread between the various sections.

References

External links 
 

Library buildings completed in 2005
Libraries in Israel
Museums in Tel Aviv
Biographical museums in Israel
Moshe Safdie buildings
2005 establishments in Israel
Libraries established in 2005
Museums established in 2005
Yitzhak Rabin